Timeslicing or time slicing may refer to:
 Time slice or preemption, a technique to implement multitasking in operating systems
 Time slicing (digital broadcasting), the apparent simultaneous performance of two or more data streams in digital video broadcasting
 Time slice photography or bullet time, a technique creating the illusion of frozen, or slowly progressing, time in motion video
 TIMESLICE, a CONFIG.SYS configuration directive in OS/2

See also
 A Slice at a Time, science fiction story